After Service is the second live album by Yellow Magic Orchestra, directly following their (at the time) final studio album, Service. The album features former ABC member David Palmer on additional drums. A film version was released alongside the album. After Service features , which was released in a studio version as a single, but does not feature on any of their albums (compilations excepted).

After Service was later expanded and remixed by Brian Eno under the title Complete Service.

Track listing

Double-LP
All songs arranged by YMO.

Single-CD release

Complete Service

Personnel
(track numbers based on the Complete Service sequencing)
Yellow Magic Orchestra - Arrangements, Electronics, Keyboards, Mixing engineers, Producers
Haruomi Hosono - Bass (4-5, 11-14), Lead Vocals (7, 11-13, 16), Backing Vocals (3-4, 6, 9-10, 14, 17-19, 21-24)
Ryuichi Sakamoto - Lead Vocals (3, 6, 8, 10-11, 16), Backing Vocals (4, 12, 14-15, 17-19, 21-24)
Yukihiro Takahashi - Electronic drums (2-4, 7, 12, 16, 20, 23-24), Cymbals (2-4, 20, 23-24), Lead Vocals (4-9, 13-19, 21-22), Backing Vocals (3, 10, 23-24)

Guest musician
David Palmer (ex-ABC) - Electronic Drums & Cymbals (5-19, 21-22)

Staff
Mitsuo Koike - Recording & Mixing engineer
Akitsugu Doi & Shinji Miyoshi - Assistant Engineers
Teppei Kasai (CBS/Sony Shinanomachi Studio) - Mastering engineer
Kazusuke Obi - A&R Coordinators
Tsuguya Inoue - Art director
Beans Suzi Sakamoto - Design
Kenji Miura - Inside Photo

Credits
Tour Crew
Planning: Makoto Sato & YMO
Production: Makoto Sato & Tadsashi Katoh
Stage Design: Kappa Senoh
Stage Direction: Osamu Yamada
Art Direction: Tsuguya Inoue
Light Planning: Jiro Katsushiba
Choreographer: Tsukio Kurotaki
Hair & Make-up: Chiaki Shimada, Kiyomi Yoshikawa (Ours), and Mikio Honda (Bijin)
Stage Staff: Takenori "Mansaku" Kubota, Terunobu Ohtsuka, Mariko Okabayashi, Satoru Ide (Create Osaka), Junji Kobayashi, Shoichi Katoh, Kazumi Hoshi, Masakatsu Yamada, Terunobu Tamaya, Yasutaka Nakano, Yoshio Kumada, Kazuo Kawakami (Kanai Ohdogu)
Sound: Ken Kondo (Front), Hiroyuki "Ah So!" Matsura (Monitor), Noriyasu "Uchiumi" Nishiumi, Yoshiaki "Noisy" Nojima (Hibino Sound), Kohji "Shacho!" Sawai (Crewbie Office)
Lighting: Takenori Hayakawa, Koyshin Suzuki, Yoshinori Kobyashi, Minoru Kobayashi, Toshiaki Hirasawa, Takashi Uehara, Kenji Muto, Kiyoto Hoshino, Sonoyo Nishikawa, Reiko Nihei, Masaki Hotei, Kazuhiko Koike (Stage Factory)
Transportation: Tadashi Ohgawara, Kazuhito Miyamoto, Toshinobu Kiyobe, Mitsuo Shimada, Tsutomu Kobayashi, Tomio Maeda (Minegishi Unso)
Instrument Care: Akimitsu Sasagawa (Crewbie Office), Kohji Kanamaru (Yoroshita Music), Masanobu Tsuchiya (Office Intenzio)
Tape Operated & Click Mixed by: Takeshi Fujii (Yoroshita Music)
Linn & Simmons Operated by: Aki Yamazoe (Yoroshita Music)

Equipment Support
TEAC Corp. (TEAC 48 Tape Recorder, DBX DX-40 Noise Reduction)
Onkyo Corp. (Onkyo PW-33 Transmitter, PR-1 Receiver)
Management: Yoichi Itoh, Junko Sugimura, Hiromitsu Fujisawa (Office Intenzio), Fumie Takahashi, Peter Barakan (Yoroshita Music)
Tour Conductor: Rima "Rimao" Yamashita (Yoroshita Music)
Tour book compiled and edited by: Hiroma Shimizu
Promotion: Kunio Tzutsu
Dancers: Jacqueline Hurley, Clare Macnamara, Tina Stubbington, Nicole Matney (FOLIO)
Executive Producer: Hiroshi Okura (Yoroshita Music)

[Re-issue]
Supervised by: Yuji Tanaka
Remastering and edited by: Mitsuo Koike at Ast studio, Tokyo, July 1999
Art Direction & Design: Takayuki Innami
Design: Kazuhiro Nozawa

References

1984 live albums
Yellow Magic Orchestra albums
Alfa Records live albums